Frank B. Simpson (1883–1966) was an American architect. A number of his works are listed on the U.S. National Register of Historic Places.

Works include (with attribution):
One or more works in Apex Historic District, roughly bounded by N. Elm, N. Salem, Center, S. Salem, and W. Chatham Sts., Apex, North Carolina (Simpson, Frank), NRHP-listed
Capital Club Building, built 1929, 16 W. Martin St., Raleigh, North Carolina (Simpson, Frank B.), NRHP-listed
W. E. B. DuBois School, 536 Franklin St., Wake Forest, North Carolina (Simpson, Frank B.), NRHP-listed
Enfield Graded School, 700 Branch St., Enfield, North Carolina (Simpson, Frank B.), NRHP-listed
Marshall High School, Blannahassett Island. W. side Bridge St., Marshall, North Carolina (Simpson, Frank B.), NRHP-listed

References

External links 

 Guide to the Kingswood Elementary School (Cary, N.C.) Plans 1953-1959

20th-century American architects
Architects from North Carolina
1883 births
1966 deaths
People from Raleigh, North Carolina